The Old Man and the Sea is a 1990 American-British adventure drama television film directed by Jud Taylor and written by Roger O. Hirson, based on the 1952 novella of the same name by Ernest Hemingway. The film stars Anthony Quinn, Gary Cole, Patricia Clarkson, and Joe Santos. It received mixed reviews and was nominated for three Primetime Creative Arts Emmy Awards.

Plot summary

Cast
 Anthony Quinn as Santiago
 Gary Cole as Tom Pruitt
 Patricia Clarkson as Mary Pruitt
 Joe Santos as Lopez
 Valentina Quinn as Angela
 Francesco Quinn as Young Santiago
 Paul Calderón as Anderez
 Sully Díaz as Maria
 Manuel Santiago as Gomez
 Alexis Cruz as Manolo

Release
The Old Man and the Sea premiered on NBC on March 25, 1990.

Awards and nominations

References

External links
 
 
 

1990 films
1990 television films
1990s adventure drama films
American adventure drama films
American survival films
British adventure drama films
British survival films
Films about fishers
Films about fishing
Films about old age
Films based on American novels
Films based on novellas
Films based on works by Ernest Hemingway
Films directed by Jud Taylor
Films scored by Bruce Broughton
Films set in Cuba
Films set on boats
Adventure television films
American drama television films
NBC network original films
Sea adventure films
Television films based on books
1990s English-language films
1990s American films
1990s British films
British drama television films